Francesco Capella (1714–1784), called Il Capella and Francesco Dagiu, was a scholar of Giovanni Battista Piazzetta. He was born in Venice, Italy. He painted history, and was chiefly employed for the churches at Bergamo, and by the state. One of his best pictures is 'St. George and the Dragon,' in the church of San Bonate.

References
 

1714 births
1784 deaths
Painters from Venice
18th-century Italian painters
Italian male painters
18th-century Italian male artists